Rudolf Bosselt (29 June 1871 – 2 January 1938) was a German sculptor. His work was part of the sculpture event in the art competition at the 1932 Summer Olympics.

References

1871 births
1938 deaths
20th-century German sculptors
20th-century German male artists
German male sculptors
Olympic competitors in art competitions
People from Perleberg